Freedom is eighth full-length studio album by Dragon Ash. It was released on March 4, 2009.

Track listing
 "Intro" – 1:31
 "Freedom" – 3:59
 "Desperado" – 3:26
 "Ordinary" – 3:47
 "Big Town Rhapsody" – 4:00
 "Velvet Touch" – 4:04
 "Mixture" – 4:05
 "Tsunagari Sunset" (繋がりSUNSET) – 4:22
 "Dear Mosh Pit" – 4:02
 "Bonita" – 3:52
 "Episode 6 feat. SHUN, SHIGEO from SBK" – 4:01
 "La Bamba" – 3:56
 "Unmei Kyoudoutai" (運命共同体) – 5:15
 "Outro" – 1:37

Dragon Ash albums
2009 albums
Victor Entertainment albums